The 1992 Colorado Buffaloes football team represented the University of Colorado at Boulder in the 1992 college football season. The team was led by head coach Bill McCartney and played their home games at Folsom Field in Boulder, Colorado. The Buffaloes participated as members of the Big 8 Conference.

Schedule

Personnel

Season summary

Colorado State

First meeting since 1989

CU - Westbrook 48 pass from Stewart (Blottiaux kick)
CU - Johnson 60 pass from Stewart (Blottiaux kick)
CSU - Ivlow 67 run (Rantzau kick)
CSU - Rantzau 36 FG
CU - Blottiaux 20 FG
CU - Fauria 17 pass from Stewart (Blottiaux kick)
CSU - Ward 9 run (Rantzau kick)
CU - Blottiaux 28 FG
CU - Blottiaux 29 FG
CU - Westbrook 6 pass from Stewart

Rushing: CSU Ivlow 6-152; CU Warren 14-66
Passing: CSU Hill 10-23-115; CU Stewart 21-36-1-409
Receiving: CSU Primus 4-81; CU Westbrook 7-130

at Baylor

BU - Weir 28 FG
CU - Fauria 7 pass from Stewart (Blottiaux kick)
CU - Blottiaux 50 FG
CU - Johnson 35 pass from Stewart (Blottiaux kick)
CU - Safety, Joe grounding in end zone
CU - Warren 1 run (Blottiaux kick)
CU - Westbrook 52 pass from Stewart (Blottiaux kick)
BU - Mims 80 pass from Joe (Weir kick)
BU - Strait 5 runn (Weir kick)
CU - Blottiaux 28 FG
BU - Bonner 33 pass from Joe (Weir kick)
CU - Warren 4 run (Blottiaux kick)
CU - Warren 14 run (Blottiaux kick)
BU - McFarland 46 interception return (Strait run)
CU - Leomiti 39 pass from Tobin (Blottiaux kick)
BU - Miller 30 pass from Joe (pass failed)

Rushing: CU Warren 19-41, BU Mims 4-22
Passing: CU Stewart 16-17-251, BU Joe 6-20-262
Receiving: CU Westbrook 11-186, BU Miller 2-82

References

Colorado
Colorado Buffaloes football seasons
Colorado Buffaloes football